is a JR East railway station located in the city of Kazuno, Akita Prefecture, Japan.

Lines
Hachimantai Station is served by the Hanawa Line, and is located 64.2 rail kilometers from the terminus of the line at Kōma Station.

Station layout
Hachimantai Station consists of one side platform serving a single bi-directional track. The station is unattended.

History
The line was nationalized on June 1, 1934, becoming part of the Japanese Government Railways (JGR) system. The JGR became the Japan National Railways (JNR) after World War II. The station was renamed to its present name on April 1, 1957. The station has been unattended since October 1, 1971. The station was absorbed into the JR East network upon the privatization of the JNR on April 1, 1987.

Passenger statistics
In fiscal 2013 (the last year for which data is available), the station was used by an average of 25 passengers daily (boarding passengers only).

Surrounding area
 
 
Hachimantai mountains

See also
 List of Railway Stations in Japan

References

External links

  

Railway stations in Japan opened in 1931
Kazuno, Akita
Hanawa Line
Railway stations in Akita Prefecture
Stations of East Japan Railway Company